Eagle Crags is a  elevation summit located in the Canaan Mountain Wilderness of Washington County in southwest Utah, United States.

Description

Topographic relief is significant as it rises  in two miles on its north side above the Virgin River which drains precipitation runoff from this mountain. Its nearest higher neighbor is Lower Mountain,  to the south, Shunesburg Mountain is four miles to the northeast, and Smithsonian Butte is four miles to the west-southwest. The uppermost part of this mountain is composed of light-colored Jurassic Navajo Sandstone which overlays the deep-red sandstone of the Kayenta Formation. Access is via the 2.8 mile Eagle Crags Trail which passes through pinyon–juniper woodland, sagebrush, blackbrush, yucca, and cacti as it gains 900 feet of elevation to the base of the sandstone pinnacles, spires, and crags. Views from the trail include Mount Kinesava, Johnson Mountain, and other landmarks within Zion National Park. This geographical feature's name was officially adopted in 1934 by the U.S. Board on Geographic Names.

Gallery

Climate
Spring and fall are the most favorable seasons to visit Eagle Crags. According to the Köppen climate classification system, it is located in a Cold semi-arid climate zone, which is defined by the coldest month having an average mean temperature below , and at least 50% of the total annual precipitation being received during the spring and summer.

See also

 Geology of the Zion and Kolob canyons area
 Colorado Plateau

References

External links
 Weather forecast: Eagle Crags
 Eagle Crags rock climbing: Mountainproject.com

Mountains of Utah
Mountains of Washington County, Utah
Sandstone formations of the United States
Colorado Plateau